The Ministry of Foreign Affairs is an Iranian government ministry headed by the Minister of Foreign Affairs, who is a member of cabinet. The current Minister of Foreign Affairs is Hossein Amir-Abdollahian, who was approved by the Parliament on 25 August 2021 after being nominated by the President.

Ministers and officials
The first minister of foreign affairs of Iran was Mirza Abdulvahab Khan, who served from 1821 to 1823. The incumbent minister is Hossein Amir-Abdollahian, who was appointed on 25 August 2021 to succeed Mohammad Javad Zarif.

The current officials of the Ministry of Foreign Affairs are:

 Minister of Foreign Affairs — Hossein Amir-Abdollahian
 Deputy for Political Affairs — Ali Bagheri
 Deputy for Legal & International Affairs — Reza Najafi
 Deputy for Economic Diplomacy Affairs — Mehdi Safari
 Deputy for Consular, Parliament and Iranians Affairs — Alireza Bigdeli
 Deputy for Administrative and Financial Affairs — Mohammad Fathali
 Spokesman & Head of the Center for Public and Media Diplomacy — Nasser Kanaani
 Head of the Center for Political and International Studies — Mohammad Hassan Sheykholeslami 
 The Minister Senior Assistant in Special Political Affairs — Ali Asghar Khaji

Assigned activities
Since 5 September 2013, the Ministry has been responsible for the negotiation of the Comprehensive agreement on Iranian nuclear program, which had previously been carried out by the Supreme National Security Council.

Building
The building of the Ministry was completed in 1939.

See also

Politics of Iran
Foreign relations of Iran
Minister of Foreign Affairs (Iran)
Commission of National-Security and Foreign-Policy (of Islamic Parliament of I.R.Iran)

References

1821 establishments in Iran
Foreign
Iran
Foreign relations of Iran
Ministries established in 1821